The Dräxlmaier Group is a globally operating automotive supplier with its headquarters in the Lower Bavarian city of Vilsbiburg, Germany. Founded in 1958, the family-owned company specializes in the production of wiring harness systems, central electrical and electronic components, interiors, and low- and high-voltage battery systems for electric mobility for premium vehicles.

Management 

Stefan Brandl and Jan Reblin are responsible for the management of the company. Stefan Brandl became the new Vice Chairman of the Dräxlmaier Group in June 2021. Fritz Dräxlmaier, who has been CEO for many years, serves as Chairman of the Board since January 2019.

Financial Information 

In 2021, the corporation group achieved a revenue of EUR 4.6 billion and had around 72,000 employees. In terms of annual revenue, in 2021 the company ranked 57th among the 100 largest automotive suppliers in the world. The company's customers include Audi, BMW, Jaguar, Land Rover, Mercedes-Benz, MINI, Porsche, Tesla, and Volkswagen.

Source: Die WeltBundesanzeigerKonzernabschluss zum Geschäftsjahr vom 01.01.2018 bis zum 31.12.2018 [Annual accounts report for the period January 2018 till December 2018](in German), published in Bundesanzeiger on 10 January 2020.Konzernabschluss zum Geschäftsjahr vom 01.01.2014 bis zum 31.12.2014 [Annual accounts report for the period January 2014 till December 2014](in German), published in Bundesanzeiger on 11 February 2016.Konzernabschluss zum Geschäftsjahr vom 01.01.2010 bis zum 31.12.2010 [Annual accounts report for the period January 2010 till December 2010](in German), published in Bundesanzeiger on 9 February 2012.

Products  
The Dräxlmaier Group supplies the international automotive industry. As an automotive supplier, the group has diversified into manufacturing of wiring harness systems, central electrical and electronic components, interior systems, as well as low- and high-voltage battery system for electric mobility. Product realisations were amongst others the interiors of the Maybach sedan and the Porsche Panamera, as well as the first door panel with visible natural fibre in the BMW i3. Further, Dräxlmaier is considered the inventor of the customised wiring harness.

Electrical systems 

The company produces all elements of a wiring harness system, such as high-voltage and battery wiring harnesses, independent wiring harnesses, data wires and engine wiring harnesses. The Dräxlmaier Group produces components, systems and packages in digital electronics for interiors and vehicle electrical systems, high-voltage energy storage and electromobility.

Connector systems  
Among other things, the company manufactures sensors and switches as well as high-voltage power distributors and fuse boxes.

Interior systems  
Dräxlmaier manufactures instrument panels, centre consoles and door panels for premium automobiles. The automotive supplier also produces complete door and cockpit modules that are adapted to the special equipment of the respective vehicle through system integration. The company also creates RGB ambient lighting.

E-Mobility systems  
The product portfolio for battery systems includes electric high-voltage and low-voltage battery systems on a lithium-ion basis from 12 volt to 900 volt and HV components for an on-board voltage greater than 60 volt as well as high-voltage switch boxes.

History

1958–1967  
 
In May 1958, Lisa and Fritz Dräxlmaier Sr. entered the growing automotive market. The first order placed with the Lower Bavarian company was the production of 50,000 wiring harnesses for the Goggomobil by Hans Glas GmbH in Dingolfing/Germany. Soon after, a second product division was established. Dräxlmaier now supplied the entire vehicle equipment (including instrument panels, door panels, seat coverings and rear shelves) for the compact car, which was built until 1969.

Dräxlmaier installed its first systems for welding door panels and forming thermoplastic sheets for the production of instrument panels in 1960. To accommodate the new equipment, the company's first own factory building was built in 1964.  
 
In 1966, BMW became a new customer.

1968–1977  
In 1968, the growing number of orders prompted Dräxlmaier to expand its Vilsbiburg site. As part of the expansion and renovation, the company set up its own mould and tool production, and installed its first computer system. In the same year, construction began on a new production and administration building. Audi and Volkswagen were supplied with products made by the Dräxlmaier Group starting in 1969 and 1971, respectively.

With a production site in Tunisia, international expansion began in 1974. In the following years, numerous other locations abroad were opened, including a production plant for wiring harnesses and interior components in Canada (1976).

1978–1987 

 
Within 20 years, the business premises of the family-owned company steadily expanded, and the number of employees rose continuously during this time, with Dräxlmaier employing almost 2000 people in the course of the 1980s. The worldwide production network also expanded. A production site was established in Braunau am Inn, Austria (1978). Four more foreign subsidiaries followed. 

In 1982, the company produced components for Mercedes-Benz for the first time. In 1983, Dräxlmaier used a mainframe computer for the first time and converted 100 workstations to electronic data processing. With the construction of the automated high-bay warehouse and the small-parts picking warehouse in 1987, the foundation for supply chain management was created. Since then, the material flow and all essential JIT/JIS processes have been controlled from here.

1988–1997  
In 1993, Dräxlmaier opened production sites in the Czechia and Romania. With the order to develop, manufacture and supply the complete cockpit for the Mercedes-Benz CLK, the company took the step to becoming a system supplier for interiors in 1994. Two years later, in 1996, the production network was expanded with the establishment of new plants in America and Mexico.

In 1997, the Dräxlmaier Group of Companies was renamed Dräxlmaier Group. In the same year, the company was appointed to install the first "Functionally Integrated System" (FIS) in the BMW 7 Series. This resulted in the development of the first interior module to integrate all electrical and electronic functions included in a car door into one comprehensive system.

In November the same year, Dräxlmaier bought the subsidiary Holzindustrie Bruchsal GmbH from the then Daimler-Benz AG.

1998-2007  
In 1998, the company moved into the new Dräxlmaier Technology Centre in Vilsbiburg. The next year, the Dräxlmaier Group produced a full-leather interior as the first system supplier for the Mercedes-Benz CL Coupe.

This was followed by the production of the complete interior of the BMW Z8. For both models, Dräxlmaier developed and supplied the wiring system.

In 2002, Dräxlmaier developed, produced and delivered the complete wiring system and interior for the Maybach luxury sedan. In addition to a second location in Landau an der Isar/Germany, in 2003 a new plant was built in Shenyang/China. Since then, Porsche, Jaguar and Cadillac have become part of the company's customer base.

In 2005-2007, further sites were opened in South Africa (2005); in 2006 in Thailand, Spain and Mexico; and in 2007 in Balti, Moldova, where Dräxlmaier built a completely new factory employing 2000 people.

2008–2017  
 
The Dräxlmaier Group introduced a natural fibre composite material for vehicle interiors in 2008. The door panel developed for the BMW 7 Series is made of biocomposite material. The same year another Eastern European location followed with the opening of a production plant in Serbia, initially employing 800 workers on three assembly lines.

In 2009, the group started building prototypes for electromobility and developed customised battery systems and components, for example for the complete interior and the electrical system of the Porsche Panamera, which was launched on the market in the same year.

In 2011, Dräxlmaier developed the world's first door panel with visible natural fibre. This was first installed in the all-electric BMW i3 in 2013. The company expanded its existing production facilities in Shenyang in 2012 and built a fully integrated production plant in Kavadarci/Macedonia. In 2013, another Dräxlmaier Group site opened in Leipzig/Germany. In the same year, a new business segment was opened with Dräxlmaier Aviation GmbH. Until 2017, the company developed and produced interiors for private and business aircraft.

Another customer, Tesla Motors, was acquired in 2014. In the same year, the company's logistics network was expanded with the facilities in Zwickau/Germany. In 2015, QESTRONIC Advanced Technologies GmbH from Geisenhausen/Germany, was integrated into the Dräxlmaier Group. One year later a new production site was opened for interior components in Langfang/China.

In cooperation with the Technical University of Munich (Germany), a research and development location was established on the Garching campus in 2017. A new production site for interior components was opened in Livermore, USA.

2018–present 

In 2018, the Dräxlmaier Campus was built on the grounds of the GALILEO centre of the Technical University of Munich in Garching. There, Dräxlmaier developers and researching professors of the TUM work on future topics of the automotive industry. In 2019, the company built its own plant with a development department in Sachsenheim near Stuttgart for the production of 800-volt automotive batteries. One year later another plant near Leipzig followed.

On April 1, 2020, Franz Haslinger and Martin Gall took on the function of CEOs of the Dräxlmaier Group. Since August 2021, Stefan Brandl and Haslinger have been responsible for the management. Long-term CEO Fritz Dräxlmaier remains associated with the company as a representative of the shareholders and continues to exercise his function as chairman of the board.

In 2021, the Dräxlmaier Group was included in the list of the World's Best Employers by Forbes.

Bibliography  
 Angstl, Martin; Baur, Yvonne; Berk, Fabian; Keil; Thomas; Pflügler, Wolfgang: Nachhaltig erfolgreich – Green Logistics made by Dräxlmaier, in: Praxishandbuch Grüne Automobillogistik. Wiesbaden: Springen Gabler 2016, ISBN 978-3-658-04808-2. 
 Brake, Ludger: Driver: Integrierter Steuerungs- und Reportingansatz der Dräxlmaier Group, in: Moderne Controllingkonzepte - Zukünftige Anforderungen erkennen und integrieren. Freiburg: Haufe 2015, ISBN 978-3-648-07216-5. 
 Nickel, Tobias: Dräxlmeier - we create character. Vilsbiburg: E-Motion Verlag 2019, .

References  
 

Auto parts suppliers of Germany
Manufacturing companies established in 1958
German brands
1958 establishments in West Germany